Co-op Legal Services offers legal advice, and provides legal services for Family Law, Divorce, Will Writing, Conveyancing, Employment Law, Probate and Personal Injury.

Co-op Legal Services is a subsidiary of The Co-operative Group in the United Kingdom. It was established in 2006 and employs over 300 staff in Manchester, London, Bristol and Sheffield. It has its head office in Manchester.

History
2006 – Established as a member only business offering Personal Injury and Legal Advisory Services.

2007 – Legal services expanded to include Will Writing, Conveyancing, Probate and Estate Administration.

2012 – Received approval from the Solicitors Regulation Authority (SRA) to become an Alternative Business Structure (ABS) under the 2007 Legal Services Act.

2012 – Legal services expanded to include Family Law and Employment Law services.

2014 – Recognised by Remember A Charity as the first corporate organisation to raise £15 million in potential charitable legacies through its Will writing services.

2016 – Acquired Sheffield-based Collective Legal Solutions.

2016 – Launched Co-op Estate Planning offering legal, funeral and inheritance plans in a customers own home, for residents of England and Wales.

2018 - Winner of Probate Provider and Will Writing Firm (National) of the Year - The British Wills and Probate Awards

Co-op values
Co-op Legal Services is part of the Co-op Group, one of the UK’s largest mutual businesses. That means that any profits are invested back into the business to improve the service offered to its clients.

Co-op membership
In 2016, The Co-op launched its Join Us campaign offering Co-op Group members a 5% reward when they purchase Co-op branded products and services, with a further 1% going to local causes.

References

Further reading

External links
 Co-op Legal Services

Law firms of England
Law firms of the United Kingdom
Legal Services